Lucas Ríos (born 8 March 1998) is an Argentine professional footballer who plays as a midfielder for Real Pilar.

Career
Ríos' career began with Unión Santa Fe. He was promoted into their senior squad midway through the 2018–19 Primera División season, appearing on the bench for a fixture with River Plate away from home and subsequently making his professional bow as an eightieth minute substitute for Diego Zabala in a 1–2 victory.

Career statistics
.

References

External links

1998 births
Living people
Place of birth missing (living people)
Argentine footballers
Association football midfielders
Argentine Primera División players
Unión de Santa Fe footballers
Real Pilar Fútbol Club players